was a Japanese theoretical physicist, known for group theory in quantum mechanics first proposed by Yamanouchi in Japan.

Yamanouchi was born in Kanagawa, graduated in physics from the Imperial University of Tokyo in 1926. From 1926 to 1927 he was a research associate at the Imperial University of Tokyo. From 1927 to 1931 he was a professor at the Tokyo Higher School. He joined the faculty of the Imperial University of Tokyo in 1929 as a lecturer of engineering and became a full professor in 1942. He was a professor of physics at the University of Tokyo from 1949 to his retirement in 1963. During 1959–1961 he was the dean of the faculty of science. In 1956 he was awarded the Japan Academy Prize for "application of group theory to the theory of atomic spectra".

See also
Group theory
Quantum mechanics

Notes

Bibliography

 

Mathematical physicists
Japanese physicists
Academic staff of the University of Tokyo
University of Tokyo alumni
1902 births
1986 deaths
Theoretical physicists
People from Kanagawa Prefecture
Presidents of the Physical Society of Japan